Northern Ireland Act (with its variations) is a stock short title used in the United Kingdom for legislation relating to Northern Ireland.

List
The Northern Ireland (Emergency Provisions) Act 1973
The Northern Ireland Act 1974
The Northern Ireland Act 1998
The Northern Ireland (Monitoring Commission etc.) Act 2003
The Northern Ireland Act 2006
The Northern Ireland (Miscellaneous Provisions) Act 2006
The Northern Ireland (St Andrews Agreement) Act 2006
The Northern Ireland (St Andrews Agreement) Act 2007
The Northern Ireland Act 2009
The Northern Ireland (Miscellaneous Provisions) Act 2014
The Northern Ireland (Executive Formation etc) Act 2019

See also
List of short titles
 Scotland Act (disambiguation)
 Wales Act 1978
 Government of Wales Act (disambiguation)

Lists of legislation by short title